Namnaq (also Romanized as Namanaq and Namenaq; also known as Namangh, Namīneh, Namna, and Namnya) is a village in Nowjeh Mehr Rural District, Siah Rud District, Jolfa County, East Azerbaijan Province, Iran. At the 2006 census, its population was 102, in 31 families.

Notes 

Populated places in Jolfa County